Captain Craddock is a 1931 German French-language musical comedy film directed by Max de Vaucorbeil and Hanns Schwarz and starring Jean Murat, Käthe von Nagy and Charles Redgie. It is a French-language version of the 1931 German film Bombs on Monte Carlo. It was shot at the Babelsberg Studios of UFA in Berlin. The film's sets were designed by the art director Erich Kettelhut. It is sometimes known as Bombe Sur Monte Carlo.

Cast
 Jean Murat as Le capitaine Craddock
 Käthe von Nagy as La reine Yola
 Charles Redgie as Pierre
 Alice Tissot as Isabelle
 Sinoël as Le consul
 Rachel Devirys as Diane
 Paul Ollivier as Le directeur du casino
 Lucien Callamand as Brégaillon
 Nicolas Redelsperger as Le ministre des finances
 Comedian Harmonists as Themselves

Cultural references
According to Philippe Goddin, author of Hergé - Chronologie d'une oeuvre, the name of Tintin'''s character Captain Haddock is inspired by this film.
In The Crab with the Golden Claws, Haddock sings one of the film songs, Les gars de la Marine''.

References

External links

1931 films
1931 musical comedy films
German musical comedy films
Films of the Weimar Republic
1930s French-language films
Films directed by Hanns Schwarz
Films directed by Max de Vaucorbeil
Operetta films
German multilingual films
Films set in Monaco
Films set in the Mediterranean Sea
Seafaring films
UFA GmbH films
Films based on German novels
German black-and-white films
Films produced by Erich Pommer
Films with screenplays by Franz Schulz
1931 multilingual films
Films shot at Babelsberg Studios
1930s German films